Prokhodnoye is a rural locality (a selo) and the administrative center of Prokhodenskoye Rural Settlement, Korochansky District, Belgorod Oblast, Russia. The population was 418 as of 2010. There are 4 streets.

Geography 
Prokhodnoye is located 11 km southwest of Korocha (the district's administrative centre) by road. Prudki is the nearest rural locality.

References 

Rural localities in Korochansky District